Lateristachys diffusa, synonym Lycopodiella diffusa, known  as carpet clubmoss, is a species of clubmoss in the family Lycopodiaceae. It is indigenous to New Zealand and to Tasmania, Australia.

Description
The main stems of this plant are found underground when growing on boggy terrain, but can occur above ground in dryer habitats. The stems are normally not more than 25 cm in length and root at intervals.

Taxonomy
The first description of this plant was published in 1810 in Prodromus Florae Novae Hollandiae et Insulae Van Diemen by Robert Brown.

Ecology
Analysis of fossilised excrement of the kakapo has shown that this plant was historically part of the diet of that endangered bird.

Conservation status
The Department of Conservation in New Zealand classifies Lateristachys diffusa as Not Threatened.

References

External links

 Syntype specimen of Lycopodiella diffusa held at the Museum of New Zealand Te Papa Tongarewa

Plants described in 1810
Flora of New Zealand
Flora of Tasmania
Lycopodiaceae